Kozjak is a common South Slavic toponym derived from koza ("goat") that may refer to:

Austria
 Kosiak, a mountain in the Karawanks in southern Austria

Bosnia and Herzegovina
 , a village near Lopare, Bosnia and Herzegovina

Bulgaria
 Kozjak or Kozyak, a medieval name of Obzor
 Kozyak, Bulgaria, a village in Silistra Province

Croatia
 Kozjak Island, an uninhabited islet near Lošinj, Croatia
 Mali Kozjak, a mountain on the Croatian Adriatic coast
 Veliki Kozjak, a mountain in the Croatian Dalmatian Zagora
 Kozjak, Bilje, a settlement in Croatian Baranja
 Kozjak Lake, the largest of the Plitvice Lakes
 Kozjak, Zagreb, a neighbourhood in Maksimir, Zagreb

North Macedonia
 , a mountain in North Macedonia
 Kozjak Hydro Power Plant, with an eponymous artificial lake in North Macedonia
 Kozjak, Resen, a village in Resen Municipality, North Macedonia
 Kozjak, Karbinci, a village in the Municipality of Karbinci, North Macedonia
 Kozjak (mountain near Pčinja), a mountain in North Macedonia and Serbia
  (Kozjačija), a region in North Macedonia and Serbia

Serbia
 Kozjak (mountain near Pčinja), a mountain in Serbia and North Macedonia
  (Kozjačija), a region in Serbia and North Macedonia
 Kozjak (Loznica), a village near Loznica, Serbia
 Novi Kozjak, a village near Alibunar, Serbia

Slovenia
 Kozjak Castle, a castle ruin near Trebnje, Slovenia
 Kozjak Mountains, north of the Drava Valley in northeastern Slovenia and southeastern Austria
 Kozjak subdialect
 Kozjak Pass, a mountain pass in the Kamnik–Savinja Alps in northern Slovenia

Settlements 
 Kozjak, Mislinja, a village near Mislinja, Slovenia
 Kozjak nad Pesnico, a village in the Municipality of Kungota, northeastern Slovenia
 Kozjak pri Ceršaku, a village in the Municipality of Šentilj, northeastern Slovenia
 Paški Kozjak, a village in the Municipality of Velenje, northeastern Slovenia
 Kozjak, a hamlet of Zabukovje in the Municipality of Šentrupert, southeastern Slovenia